Jurjan Mannes (born 26 January 1992 in Groningen) is a Dutch professional footballer who currently plays as a midfielder for HHC Hardenberg in the Dutch Tweede Divisie.

References

External links

1992 births
Living people
Dutch footballers
FC Twente players
Fortuna Sittard players
FC Emmen players
SC Cambuur players
Eerste Divisie players
Tweede Divisie players
Footballers from Groningen (city)
Association football midfielders
Jong FC Twente players